Kierron Mason (born 14 August 1998) is a Trinidadian international footballer who currently plays for Charleston Battery in the USL Championship.

Career
From 2018 to 2019, Mason played for W Connection F.C. of the TT Pro League.

On 8 March 2019, Charleston Battery of the USL Championship announced they had signed Mason for the 2019 season.

References

External links
 

1998 births
Living people
Trinidad and Tobago footballers
Trinidad and Tobago expatriate footballers
W Connection F.C. players
Charleston Battery players
USL Championship players
Trinidad and Tobago under-20 international footballers
Association football midfielders